Canarium vitiense is a rainforest tree species, of the plant family Burseraceae, growing naturally in Fiji, the Solomon Islands, Samoa, Tonga, New Guinea, Bismarck Archipelago, Admiralty Islands, Louisiade Archipelago, Torres Strait Islands and in lowland north-eastern Queensland, Australia.

In New Guinea, they are recorded as growing widely in rainforests up about  altitude.

In the Torres Strait Islands (Australia), likewise they are recorded as growing up about  altitude.

In the Australian mainland north-eastern Queensland regions of the Wet Tropics, Cape York Peninsula and just to their east the continent's offshore islands, they are recorded as growing naturally widespread, from about Ingham–Hinchinbrook Island northwards, in remaining well developed lowland tropical rainforests, below ca.  altitude.

Formal description of some trees found in Fiji, using this species name, was published in 1854 by botanist Asa Gray, effectively describing this species of all of these trees across the western Pacific region.

References

External links

vitiense
Flora of the Southwestern Pacific
Trees of Papuasia
Flora of Queensland
Sapindales of Australia